Philippa Helen Gander  is a New Zealand sleep researcher. In 2021, she was conferred with the title of emeritus professor by Massey University, where she had been inaugural director of the Sleep/Wake Research Centre until stepping down from that role in 2019.

Academic career
Gander wrote her master's thesis at the University of Auckland in 1976 with the title A model for the circadian pacemaker of Hemideina thoracica derived from the effects of temperature on its activity rhythm. After a 1980 PhD titled Circadian organization in the regulation of locomotor activity and reproduction in Rattus exulans at the same institution, Gander took up a Fulbright Fellowship at Harvard Medical School in 1980. She moved to the NASA-Ames Research Center in 1983 as part of the flight crew fatigue and jet-lag research programme. Gander returned to New Zealand in 1998, and established the Sleep/Wake Research Centre at the Wellington School of Medicine with the assistance of funding from the Health Research Council of New Zealand. She moved to Massey University and was appointed a full professor in 2003, and the research centre became part of Massey's newly established research school of public health.

In 2009, Gander was elected a Fellow of the Royal Society of New Zealand. In the 2017 Queen's Birthday Honours, she was appointed an Officer of the New Zealand Order of Merit, for services to the study of sleep and fatigue.

Selected works

References

Living people
New Zealand women academics
Year of birth missing (living people)
University of Auckland alumni
Academic staff of the Massey University
New Zealand medical researchers
Sleep researchers
New Zealand women writers
Officers of the New Zealand Order of Merit